Joel Moss (born May 11, 1946) is an American record producer, sound engineer and mixer.

Earlier years
Moss was born in 1946 in Detroit, Michigan, to Jay Harmon and Dorothy Moss. At the age of twelve, he was performing with American and Canadian folk groups. He majored in architecture at the University of Minnesota. As a student he was able to work with the Minnesota Orchestra and recorded musicians such as Al Jarreau, Bobby Lyle and Willy Weeks. When folk music's popularity waned, Moss became a sound engineer and producer for rock and roll bands in Detroit.

He moved to Los Angeles in 1969 and found work producing and engineering projects for recording artists such as Little Richard, Joe Cocker and Johnny Cash. He became the executive director and chief engineer of The Record Plant Recording Studios in 1986. This recording company operated Paramount Pictures scoring stage, which enabled Moss to expand his musical endeavors with film music. He was able to develop new technology and production techniques. He became a member of the advisory board developing digital formats for film sound.

In 1990, he worked and became associated with the Hollywood Bowl Orchestra. Some of his associates were te maestro John Mauceri, Anne Parsons and the  composer Michael Gore.

He founded his own Managra Music company in 1997, specializing in jazz and theatre.

Moving to New York
In 2000, Moss was hired as a sound engineer and mixer by Kurt Deutsch and Sherie Rene Scott, the founders of Sh-K-Boom Records, a recording label that specializes in recording Broadway cast albums. Although most of the recording is done in New York City, he said he does production work at home.<ref>{{Cite web |url=http://www.saratogian.com/articles/2009/02/11/news/doc49923c1d314ec525374683.txt |title=11"/>

Grammy Award
One of Moss's Grammy Awards was won for Best Musical Show Album for producing the cast recording of In the Heights, a musical that opened on Broadway in 2008 about life in the street of Manhattan’s Washington Heights neighborhood. The show has different types of Latin music, including rap, salsa and meringue.

Moss was once quoted as saying, "I’m a bit cynical about awards in general, especially in today’s world; working is a lot more exciting than a reward. Also, to receive an award in a Broadway category when Broadway, like many things, is in dire straits is kind of daunting."

Of Moss’s seven Grammy awards, he said the most meaningful was recording Ray Charles for his album You Don't Know Me, recorded in 2004 and released in 2005. "The Grammy I won, for Ray Charles, was very special, because I was the last person who recorded him. He died a few days later. I was happy to be a part of it," Moss said.

Following a world premiere at the Colonial Theatre in Boston, High Fidelity, began previews on Broadway on November 20, 2006, opening on December 7. The musical closed at the Imperial Theatre on December 17. The single CD was produced by Moss and the Sh-K-Boom/Ghostlight President Kurt Deutsch. The recording has the original Broadway company, including Will Chase and Jenn Colella.

Moss was one of the engineers and sound mixers for Tony Bennett's Playin' with My Friends: Bennett Sings the Blues, winner of a 2002 Grammy Award.

Moss was one of the producers; Lin-Manuel Miranda, composer/lyricist (Original Broadway Cast with Lin-Manuel Miranda and others)
[Razor & Tie Entertainment/Ghostlight Records],.

After the opening of Aida starring Adam Pascal, Moss produced Pascal's first solo CD, Model Prisoner, heralded by critics as "a modern rock masterpiece". On Sh-k-boom Records, Moss is  dedicated to bridging the gap between pop music and theater. His credits include The Eagles, Joe Cocker, Talking Heads and Red Hot Chili Peppers.
In 2005 they were invited to participate in a collaborative effort of original compositions involving 13 other outstanding artists of the Capital District of New York which resulted in Saratoga Pie, a CD produced by Moss.

Selective list of albums to which Moss contributed
The Film Music of Alex North as sound editor. Nonesuch Label 1986
The Mosquito Coast (original soundtrack recording) as sound engineer.  Fantasy Label 1987
Fatal Attraction (original motion picture) as sound recorder and mixer.  GNP/Crescendo label 1987
Omen IV: The Awakening (original motion picture soundtrack) as sound mixer and engineer. Varese Sarabande Label 1991
South Pacific (music from the ABC Premiere Event) as engineer, sound mixer and producer. Sony Music Label 2001
Hollywood Bowl Orchestra on Broadway as sound mixer and engineer.  Phillips Label 1996
Disney's Silly Classical Songs as sound mixer and engineer. Disney Label 2001
Chicago (The Miramax motion picture) as engineer.  Sony Music Label 2002
Little Women (original Broadway cast recording) as producer, audio producer, sound mixer. Ghostlight Label 1905
The 25th Annual Putnam County Spelling Bee (original Broadway cast recording] as producer, sound mixer, recorder. Ghoslight Label 2005

References

1946 births
Living people
Businesspeople from Detroit
University of Minnesota School of Architecture alumni
Record producers from Michigan
American audio engineers